The 7th Infantry Division (Hanja: 第七步兵師團) is a military formation of the Republic of Korea Army, currently employed on patrol duty in the Korean Demilitarized Zone around Hwacheon County, Gangwon Province. It has a GOP(General outpost) brigade (5th or 8th Brigade), a reserve brigade (3rd Brigade), an artillery brigade, and a subordinate force.

Structure 
 Headquarters:
Headquarters Company
Intelligence Company
Air Defense Company
Reconnaissance Battalion
Engineer Battalion
Armored Battalion
Signal Battalion
Support Battalion
Military Police Battalion
Medical Battalion
Chemical Battalion
 3rd Infantry Brigade
 5th Infantry Brigade
 8th Infantry Brigade
 Artillery Brigade

History 
During the Korean War, the 7th Infantry Division served a total of 28 battles. In particular, the Yeongcheon at the time to perform on the defense division president received a citation for troops to destroy the two Democratic People's Republic of Korea in battle of the world.

The division first started from Youngsan, Seoul on June 10, 1949. The division first saw combat on September 14, 1949, in an operation on Jirisan Mt. to fight Communist guerillas. This division was, after the fall of Taejon, only had a few hundred survivors to participate in the Battle of Pusan Perimeter. During the Battle of Pusan Perimeter, The 7th Infantry Division regrouped with the 3rd, 5th, and 8th infantry regiments to become what formation they have, and destroyed size of two divisions of North Korean army during the Battle of YeongCheon.

On 26 November 1950, a column of retreating ROK Korean soldiers of the ROK 6th and 7th Divisions from Tokchon was attacked by a battalion of the Turkish Brigade  who were the first to arrive at Wawon, after the Turks mistook the Koreans for Chinese. 125 Koreans were taken prisoner and many of them were slaughtered by the Turks. The event was wrongly reported in American and European media as a Turkish victory over the Chinese and even after news leaked out about the truth to the Americans, no efforts were made by the media to fix the story.

After the Chinese intervention and attacks in November 1950, the U.S. 2d Infantry Division, the Turkish Brigade, and the ROK 6th, 7th, and 8th Infantry Divisions suffered substantial loss that they needed extensive rest and refitting to recover combat effectiveness. After recovery, The 7th Division took part of the operation as II Corps's command such as the Retaking of Hwacheon and the Battle of Gumsung.

References

Sources

External link

InfDiv0007
InfDiv0007SK
Military units and formations established in 1949
Hwacheon County